is a Japanese professional footballer who plays as a forward for Machida Zelvia.

References

External links

1996 births
Living people
Japanese footballers
Association football forwards
FC Machida Zelvia players
J2 League players